Red Dawn is a 1984 film by John Milius.

Red dawn may also refer to:

Entertainment
Red Dawn (2012 film), a remake of the 1984 film
"Red Dawn" (X-Men episode), an episode from the second season of the X-Men animated series
"Red Dawn", a third season episode of Sealab 2021
Red Dawn (audio drama), a 2000 Doctor Who audio drama
"Red Dawn", the sixth movement of the 1992 Mike Oldfield album Tubular Bells II
"Red Dawn" (Supergirl), an episode of Supergirl
 "Red Dawn" (American Horror Story), an episode of the ninth season of American Horror Story

Other
 Red Color, a system used to alert Israeli civilians about impending rocket attacks, known until 2007 as "Red Dawn"
 Operation Red Dawn, a military operation conducted by the United States armed forces resulting in the capture of Saddam Hussein
 Dawn Primarolo, the Labour MP for Bristol South, who is nicknamed "Red Dawn"
 Weather lore, for folk meaning of a red colored dawn

See also

 Red Sky at Morning (disambiguation)
 Crimson Dawn (disambiguation)
 Krasnaya Zarya (disambiguation), for names related to its translation into Russian
Rojo Amanecer, a 1989 Mexican film